Epiperipatus beckeri is a species of velvet worm in the family Peripatidae. Females of this species have 28 to 30 pairs of legs. The type locality is in Bahia state in Brazil.

References 

Onychophorans of tropical America
Onychophoran species
Animals described in 2018